The Irene class was a class of protected cruisers built by the Imperial German Navy (Kaiserliche Marine) in the late 1880s. They were modernized in 1899–1905, and their armament was upgraded with new, quick-firing guns.

Both ships served in the East Asia station with the East Asia Squadron; Prinzess Wilhelm played a major role in the seizure of the Kiautschou Bay concession in November 1897. Both ships returned to Germany at the turn of the 20th century, and remained in European waters until 1914, when they were removed from active service. They were reduced to secondary roles then, and continued to serve until the early 1920s, when they were sold for scrap.

Design

General characteristics 

The hull was constructed with transverse and longitudinal steel frames, and the outer hull consisted of wood planking covered with Muntz copper sheathing to prevent fouling. The stem was made of bronze below the waterline and iron above. The hull was divided into 10 watertight compartments and had a double bottom that extended for 49 percent of the length of the hull.

The ships were very good sea boats; they ran very well before the wind, and were very handy. They lost minimal speed in hard turns and suffered from moderate roll and pitch. In heavy seas, the ships were capable of only half speed, as both suffered from structural weakness in the forecastle. The ships had a crew of 28 officers and 337 enlisted men. The ships carried a number of smaller boats, including two picket boats, one pinnace, two cutters, one yawl, and two dinghies.

Machinery 
Irenes propulsion system consisted of two horizontal, 2-cylinder double-expansion steam engines that drove a pair of screw propellers. Irene was equipped with a pair of three-bladed screws  in diameter; Prinzess Wilhelm had slightly larger  screws with four blades. Steam was provided by four coal-fired fire-tube boilers, which were ducted into a pair of funnels. Irenes engines were manufactured by Wolfsche, while AG Germania produced those for Prinzess Wilhelm. The ships were equipped with a pair of electrical generators that produced  at 67 volts. Steering was controlled by a single rudder.

Armament and armor 
The ships were armed with a main battery of four 15 cm RK L/30 guns in single pedestal mounts, supplied with 400 rounds of ammunition in total. The ships also carried ten shorter-barreled 15 cm RK L/22 guns in single mounts. The gun armament was rounded out by six 3.7 cm revolver cannon, which provided close-range defense against torpedo boats. They were also equipped with three  torpedo tubes with eight torpedoes, two launchers were mounted on the deck and the third was in the bow, below the waterline.

The ships were protected with compound steel armor. The conning tower had 50 mm thick sides and a 20 mm thick roof. The ships were equipped with cork cofferdams to contain flooding in the event of damage below the waterline.

Modifications
The ships were modernized in Wilhelmshaven between 1899 and 1905. Eight  SK L/35 quick-firing (QF) guns were installed in place of the L/22 guns, and six  SK L/40 QF guns were added. The alterations to the ships' guns allowed the number of officers to be reduced to 17, though enlisted ranks increased to 357.

Service history 

Irene was the first protected cruiser built by the German navy. She was ordered under the contract name "Ersatz " and was laid down at the AG Vulcan shipyard in Stettin in 1886. She was launched on 23 July 1887, after which fitting-out work commenced. She was commissioned into the German navy on 25 May 1888. Prinzess Wilhelm was ordered under the contract name "Ersatz " and was laid down at the Germaniawerft shipyard in Kiel in 1886. She was launched on 22 September 1887, after which fitting-out work commenced. She was commissioned into the German navy on 13 November 1889.

Both Irene and Prinzess Wilhelm saw extensive service with the German fleet. Irene frequently escorted Kaiser Wilhelm II's yacht on cruises throughout Europe. In 1894, Irene was deployed to East Asian waters; Prinzess Wilhelm joined her the following year. Prinzess Wilhelm was one of three ships involved in the seizure of the naval base Kiaochou Bay in November 1897, led by Admiral Otto von Diederichs. Irene was in dock for engine maintenance at the time, and so she was not present during the operation. As a result of the seizure, the Cruiser Division was reorganized as the East Asia Squadron. Both ships were present in the Philippines in the immediate aftermath of the Battle of Manila Bay between American and Spanish squadrons during the Spanish–American War in 1898. Diederichs hoped to use the crisis as an opportunity to seize another naval base in the region, though this was unsuccessful.

Prinzess Wilhelm returned to Germany in 1899 and was modernized in 1899–1903. Irene followed her sister back to Germany in 1901, and was similarly modified in 1903–1905. Both ships remained in service until early 1914, when they were retired from front-line service and used for secondary duties. Irene was converted into a submarine tender. She served in this capacity until 1921, when she was sold for scrap and broken up the following year. Prinzess Wilhelm was reduced to a mine hulk in February 1914 and ultimately broken up for scrap in 1922.

Notes

References

Further reading
 

Cruiser classes